25-Hydroxyvitamin D 1-alpha-hydroxylase (VD 1A hydroxylase) also known as calcidiol 1-monooxygenase  or cytochrome p450 27B1 (CYP27B1) or simply 1-alpha-hydroxylase is a cytochrome P450 enzyme that in humans is encoded by the CYP27B1 gene.

VD 1A hydroxylase is located in the proximal tubule of the kidney and a variety of other tissues, including skin (keratinocytes), immune cells,  and bone (osteoblasts).

Reactions 
The enzyme catalyzes the hydroxylation of  calcifediol to calcitriol (the bioactive form of Vitamin D):

calcidiol + 2 reduced adrenodoxin + 2 H+ + O2   calcitriol + 2 oxidized adrenodoxin + H2O

The enzyme is also able to oxidize ercalcidiol (25-OH D2) to ercalcitriol, secalciferol to calcitetrol, and 25-hydroxy-24-oxocalciol to (1S)-1,25-dihydroxy-24-oxocalciol.

Clinical significance 
Loss-of-function mutations in CYP27B1 cause Vitamin D-dependent rickets, type IA.

Interactive pathway map

References

Further reading

External links 
 
 
 

EC 1.14.13
NADPH-dependent enzymes
Human proteins